Archibald Currie may refer to:
Archibald Currie (American politician), see North Carolina General Assembly of 1777
Archibald Currie (Canadian politician), Canadian politician 
Archibald Currie (Surinamese politician), Surinamese politician
Archibald Currie (shipowner)  (1830–1914), Melbourne shipowner